The Old College Lawn Tennis and Croquet Club is in West Dulwich, Southwark, southeast London, England, to the east off Gallery Road. The "Old College" name was adopted due to its longstanding close association with Dulwich College, its president often being the college Master.

The club has seven tennis courts.
In 2009, three of the courts were resurfaced with cushioned porous acrylic.
The remaining courts have all-weather macadam surfaces.
In 2010, an online booking system was introduced.

Close by are Dulwich Park and to the west Belair Park.

References

External links 
 Old College Lawn Tennis & Croquet Club website

Multi-sport clubs in the United Kingdom
Sports venues in London
Sport in the London Borough of Southwark
Parks and open spaces in the London Borough of Southwark
Tennis venues in London
Croquet in the United Kingdom
Clubs and societies in London
Dulwich
Croquet clubs
Tennis clubs